Six ships of the French navy have borne the name Dupetit-Thouars in honour of Aristide Aubert du Petit-Thouars, hero of the Battle of the Nile:
 A bomb longboat (1799)
 , a brig which served in the French intervention in Mexico (1828–1865)
 , a cruiser (1867–1897)
 , a   armoured cruiser (1901–1918)

External links 
 Les bâtiments ayant porté le nom de Du Petit Thouars
 Les bâtiments ayant porté le nom de Dupetit-Thouars

French Navy ship names
Dupetit Thouars family